The 1936 Monaco Grand Prix was a Grand Prix motor race held at Circuit de Monaco on 13 April 1936.

Heavy rain contributed to a series of accidents, while a broken oil line on the Alfa Romeo of Mario Tadini led to so many wrecks in the chicane out of the tunnel it was almost impassable. The Mercedes-Benzes of Louis Chiron, Luigi Fagioli, and Manfred von Brauchitsch, as well as Bernd Rosemeyer's Typ C of newcomer Auto Union, were all eliminated. Tazio Nuvolari in the Alfa Romeo 8C benefitted from the chaos, only to suffer brake fade, and Rudolf Caracciola, proving the truth of his nickname, Regenmeister (Rainmaster), went on to win for Mercedes. He was followed by Achille Varzi and Hans Stuck, both for Auto Union.

Classification

References

Kettlewell, Mike. "Monaco: Road Racing on the Riviera", in Northey, Tom, editor. World of Automobiles, Volume 12, pp. 1381–4. London: Orbis, 1974.

Monaco Grand Prix
Monaco Grand Prix
Grand Prix